Lamesteer National Wildlife Refuge is an  National Wildlife Refuge in eastern Montana, U.S. All of the acreage is an easement refuge and is on privately owned land but the landowners and U.S. Government work cooperatively to protect the resources. The refuge was set aside to preserve habitat for migratory birds that frequent Lamesteer Reservoir, and the refuge and reservoir are named after Lame Steer Creek. The refuge is unstaffed and is managed from Medicine Lake National Wildlife Refuge.

The 2007 plan for the refuge proposed to remove the refuge from the National Wildlife Refuge System and relinquish the easement to the current landowners.

References

External links
 Oh Ranger: Lamesteer National Wildlife Refuge
 Medicine Lake National Wildlife Refuge Complex—Montana - includes Lamesteer NWR

National Wildlife Refuges in Montana
Easement refuges
Protected areas of Wibaux County, Montana